The Bears–Giants rivalry is a National Football League (NFL) rivalry between the Chicago Bears and the New York Giants. The rivalry was notable for the six NFL championship games between the two teams prior to the creation of the Super Bowl, and the two subsequent Super Bowl-era playoff meetings that involved two of the NFL's greatest defensive units: the Bears' 46 defense crew helmed by Buddy Ryan, and the Giants' Big Blue Wrecking Crew mentored by Bill Belichick.

History

Pre-Super Bowl era
The Bears and Giants met in six NFL championship games, more than any common matchup in either the NFL Championship or Super Bowl. Between 1933 and 1946, the Bears and/or the Giants appeared in 12 of 14 NFL championship games, and combined to win seven championships in that span. Their first meeting came in the first-ever NFL Championship Game that concluded the 1933 season. In a close-knit affair, the Bears won the game and the championship 23–21 by scoring the game-winning touchdown in the final two minutes of the fourth quarter. It was Chicago's second consecutive championship, having previously won in 1932 when the league awarded the title to the team with the best regular season winning percentage. However, the Giants returned the favor in the 1934 NFL Championship Game, winning 30–13 by outscoring the Bears 27–0 in the fourth quarter. The game was forever immortalized as the Sneakers Game, as the Giants switched to basketball sneakers at the half due to the slick frozen conditions that affected the Polo Grounds field. 

The Bears and Giants met for a third time in the 1941 NFL Championship Game. This game was notable as it happened two weeks following the Japanese attack on Pearl Harbor; as a result, only 13,341 fans attended the game at Wrigley Field, the lowest of any NFL championship game. The Bears dominated the Giants 37–9 to win their fifth NFL title, thanks to four unanswered touchdowns in the second half. A fourth meeting took place in the 1946 NFL Championship Game, in which a then-record 58,346 fans witnessed the Bears defeat the Giants 24–14 in New York. The game was tied 14–14 after three quarters before the Bears scored ten unanswered points. The victory was marred, however, by a bribery scandal involving two Giants players.

In the 1956 NFL Championship Game, the Giants routed the Bears 47–7 at Yankee Stadium to win the championship. It was the team's last title until Super Bowl XXI in 1986. Similar to the 1934 title game, the Giants wore sneakers in order to gain traction on an icy field.  Seven years later, the Giants and Bears met for a sixth time to decide the 1963 NFL Championship. In a low-scoring affair, the Bears prevailed 14–10 to win their eighth NFL championship, their last until Super Bowl XX in 1985. It was also the final meeting between the Bears and Giants that decided the NFL championship.

Super Bowl era
The two teams underwent lengthy rebuilding periods following the 1963 title game, but in the 1980s, the Bears and Giants reemerged into title contention, thanks to two of the greatest defensive units in NFL history. Chicago's 46 defense, coached by Mike Ditka and defensive coordinator Buddy Ryan, featured Hall of Fame linebacker Mike Singletary, and defensive ends Richard Dent and Dan Hampton. New York's Big Blue Wrecking Crew, on the other hand, were coached by Bill Parcells and defensive coordinator Bill Belichick, and featured Hall of Fame linebackers Lawrence Taylor, Carl Banks and Harry Carson. The two teams first squared off in the 1985 NFC Divisional Round, in which Chicago's defensive crew outplayed their Giant counterparts in a 21–0 shutout. The tone of the game was set when a punt attempt by Giants punter Sean Landeta was muffed in the strong winds and Shaun Gayle returned it five yards for a touchdown. The Bears went on to win the Super Bowl that season. A rematch then took place in the 1990 NFC Divisional Round, which also ended in a blowout. This time, however, the Giants dominated Chicago in a 31–3 rout, and went on to win Super Bowl XXV. To date, this was the most recent meeting in the playoffs between the Bears and the Giants.

Recent years
After the 1990 playoff meeting, the rivalry cooled off a bit, though games between the two teams remained highly competitive. However, there were some notable moments that took place since then. During Week 10 of the 2006 season, Bears returner Devin Hester returned a missed field goal a then-record 108 yards for a touchdown, culminating in the Bears' 38–20 victory. The win proved crucial for the Bears as they went on to finish with the NFC's best record at 13–3, en route to a Super Bowl XLI appearance. The Giants, on the other hand, turned a 6–2 start into a 2–6 finish, ending with an 8–8 record and losing in the Wild Card Round to the rival Philadelphia Eagles. Then in Week 4 of the 2010 season, the Giants defense sacked Bears quarterback Jay Cutler nine times in the first half en route to a 17–3 victory, dealing Chicago its first loss of the season. In a Week 13 game in 2018, the Bears trailed the Giants 27–17. With 1:15 left in regulation, Bears kicker Cody Parkey kicked a field goal which made it 27–20. The Bears recovered the onside-kick with 1:13 left which was recovered by Daniel Brown. The Bears drove from their own 44 to the Giants' 1 with 3 seconds left. On a last ditch play, quarterback Chase Daniel handed it off to Trey Burton who tossed the ball back to Tarik Cohen and Cohen threw the ball for a touchdown to Anthony Miller with no time on the clock. The extra point by Parkey was good which sent the game to overtime tied at 27. The Giants won the overtime coin toss and received the ball. The Giants drove from their own 25 to the Bears' 23. They got backed to the 26 where they would kick a field goal to take a 30–27 lead with 5:57 left in the game. But the Bears failed to respond after Daniel fumbled 3 times and failed a last ditch pass deep down the field that was broken up to preserve a 30–27 Giants win.

Game results 

|-
| rowspan="2"| 
| style="| Bears  19–7
| Polo Grounds
| Bears  1–0
| Giants' inaugural season. First meeting at Polo Grounds.
|-
| style="| Giants  9–0
| Wrigley Field
| Tied  1–1
| First meeting at Wrigley Field.
|-
| 
| style="| Bears  7–0
| Wrigley Field
| Bears  2–1
| 
|- 
| 
| style="| Giants   13–7
| Polo Grounds
| Tied  2–2
| Giants win 1927 NFL Championship.
|- 
| 
| style="| Bears  13–0
| Wrigley Field
| Bears  3–2
|
|-
| rowspan="3"| 
| style="| Giants  26–14
| Wrigley Field
| Tied  3–3
| 
|-
| style="| Giants  34–0
| Polo Grounds
| Giants  4–3
| Giants take first lead in the series.
|-
| style="| Giants  14–9
| Wrigley Field
| Giants  5–3
| 
|-

|-
| rowspan="2"| 
| style="| Giants  12–0
| Wrigley Field
| Giants  6–3
| 
|-
| style="| Bears  12–0
| Polo Grounds
| Giants  6–4
| 
|-
| rowspan="3"| 
| style="| Bears  6–0
| Wrigley Field
| Giants  6–5
| 
|-
| style="| Bears  12–6
| Polo Grounds
| Tied  6–6
| 
|-
| style="| Giants  25–6
| Wrigley Field
| Giants  7–6
|
|-
| rowspan="2"| 
| style="| Bears  28–8
| Polo Grounds
| Tied  7–7
| rowspan="2"| Bears won 1932 NFL Championship.
|-
| style="| Bears  6–0
| Wrigley Field
| Bears  8–7
|-
| rowspan="2"| 
| style="| Bears  14–10
| Wrigley Field
| Bears  9–7
| 
|-
| style="| Giants  3–0
| Polo Grounds
| Bears  9–8
|
|-
! 1933 playoffs
! style="| Bears  23–21
! Wrigley Field
! Bears  10–8
! First scheduled NFL Championship game in league history.
|-
| rowspan="2"| 
| style="| Bears  27–7
| Wrigley Field
| Bears  11–8
| 
|-
| style="| Bears  10–9
| Polo Grounds
| Bears  12–8
|
|-
! 1934 playoffs
! style="| Giants  30–13
! Polo Grounds
! Bears  12–9
! 1934 NFL Championship Game.  Popularly known as the Sneakers Game. 
|-
| rowspan="2"| 
| style="| Bears  20–3
| Polo Grounds
| Bears  13–9
| rowspan="2"| Giants lose NFL Championship.
|-
| style="| Giants  3–0
| Wrigley Field
| Bears  13–10
|- 
| 
| style="| Bears  25–7
| Polo Grounds
| Bears  14–10
|
|- 
| 
| Tie  3–3
| Polo Grounds
| Bears  14–10–1
| Bears lose NFL Championship.
|- 
| 
| style="| Giants  16–13
| Polo Grounds
| Bears  14–11–1
| Giants lose NFL Championship.
|-

|- 
| 
| style="| Bears  37–21
| Polo Grounds
| Bears  15–11–1
| Bears win NFL Championship.
|-
! 1941 playoffs
! style="| Bears  37–9
! Wrigley Field
! Bears  16–11–1
! 1941 NFL Championship Game
|- 
| 
| style="| Bears  26–7
| Wrigley Field
| Bears  17–11–1
| Bears lose NFL Championship.
|- 
| 
| style="| Bears  56–7
| Polo Grounds
| Bears  18–11–1
| Most lopsided Bears victory and highest-scoring game in the rivalry. Bears win NFL Championship.
|- 
| 
| style="| Giants  14–0
| Polo Grounds
| Bears  18–12–1
| 
|-
! 1946 playoffs
! style="| Bears  24–14
! Polo Grounds
! Bears  19–12–1
! 1946 NFL Championship Game
|- 
| 
| style="| Bears  35–14
| Wrigley Field
| Bears  20–12–1
| 
|- 
| 
| style="| Giants  35–28
| Polo Grounds
| Bears  20–13–1
| Final meeting at Polo Grounds.
|-

|- 
| 
| Tie  17–17
| Yankee Stadium
| Bears  20–13–2
| First meeting at Yankee Stadium.
|-
! 1956 playoffs
! style="| Giants  47–7
! Yankee Stadium
! Bears  20–14–2
! 1956 NFL Championship Game|NFL Championship Game.  Giants' largest margin of victory in the rivalry.
|-

|- 
| 
| style="| Giants  26–24
| Wrigley Field
| Bears  20–15–2
| Giants lose NFL Championship.
|-
! 1963 playoffs
! style="| Bears  14–10
! Wrigley Field
! Bears  21–15–2
! Sixth and final NFL Championship Game between the two teams. The Bears finished with a 4–2 record in NFL Championship Games against the Giants. Last playoff meeting until 1985.
|- 
| 
| style="| Bears  35–14
| Yankee Stadium
| Bears  22–15–2
| 
|- 
| 
| style="| Bears  34–7
| Wrigley Field
| Bears  23–15–2
| Final meeting at Wrigley Field.
|- 
| 
| style="| Giants  28–24
| Yankee Stadium
| Bears  23–16–2
| 
|-

|-
| 
| style="| Bears  24–16
| Yankee Stadium
| Bears  24–16–2
| Final meeting at Yankee Stadium.
|-
| 
| style="| Bears  24–16
| Soldier Field
| Bears  25–16–2
| First meeting at Soldier Field.
|-
| 
| style="| Bears  
| Giants Stadium
| Bears  26–16–2
| First meeting at Giants Stadium.
|-

|-
! 1985 playoffs
! style="| Bears  21–0
! Soldier Field
! Bears  27–16–2
! NFC Divisional Round. Bears win Super Bowl XX.
|-
| 
| style="| Bears  34–19
| Soldier Field
| Bears  28–16–2
| 
|-

|-
! 1990 playoffs
! style="| Giants  31–3
! Giants Stadium
! Bears  28–17–2
! NFC Divisional Round. First meeting in New York since 1977. Giants win Super Bowl XXV. Most recent playoff meeting between the two teams.
|-
| 
| style="| Bears  20–17
| Soldier Field
| Bears  29–17–2
| 
|-
| 
| style="| Giants  27–14
| Soldier Field
| Bears  29–18–2
| 
|-
| 
| style="| Giants  26–20
| Soldier Field
| Bears  29–19–2
| 
|-
| 
| style="| Bears  27–24
| Giants Stadium
| Bears  30–19–2
| 
|-

|-
| 
| style="| Giants  14–7
| Soldier Field
| Bears  30–20–2
| Giants lose Super Bowl XXXV.
|-
| 
| style="| Bears  28–21
| Giants Stadium
| Bears  31–20–2
| 
|-
| 
| style="| Bears  38–20
| Giants Stadium
| Bears  32–20–2
| Final meeting at Giants Stadium. Bears lose Super Bowl XLI.
|-
| 
| style="| Giants  21–16
| Soldier Field
| Bears  32–21–2
| Giants win Super Bowl XLII.
|-

|-
| 
| style="| Giants  17–3
| MetLife Stadium
| Bears  32–22–2
| First meeting at MetLife Stadium.
|-
| 
| style="| Bears  27–21
| Soldier Field
| Bears  33–22–2
| 
|-
| 
| style="| Giants  22–16
| MetLife Stadium
| Bears  33–23–2
| 
|-
| 
| style="| Giants  
| MetLife Stadium
| Bears  33–24–2
| 
|-
| 
| style="| Bears  19–14
| Soldier Field
| Bears  34–24–2
|
|-

|-
| 
| style="| Bears  17–13
| Soldier Field
| Bears  35–24–2
| No fans in attendance for game due to COVID-19 pandemic.
|-
| 
| style="| Bears  29–3
| Soldier Field
| Bears  36–24–2
| 
|-
| 
| style="| Giants  20–12
| MetLife Stadium
| Bears  36–25–2
| 
|-

|-
| Regular season
| style="| 
| 
| 
| 
|-
| Postseason
| style="| 
| Bears 4–0
| Giants 3–1
| NFC Divisional Round: 1985, 1990. NFL Championship Game: 1933, 1934, 1941, 1946, 1956, 1963
|-
| Regular and postseason 
| style="| 
| 
| 
|  
|-

See also
 National Football League rivalries
 Bulls–Knicks rivalry

References

External links
 The BEST Moments from Giants vs. Bears Rivalry History at the New York Giants official YouTube channel

National Football League rivalries
Chicago Bears
New York Giants
New York Giants rivalries
Chicago Bears rivalries